Brickell Flatiron is a residential skyscraper in the Brickell district of Miami, Florida. The luxury condominium is named "flatiron" due to the triangular lot it is built on, similar to the Flatiron Building in New York City. The 736-foot-high tower is currently the tallest condominium south of New York City.

History
Brickell Flatiron was originally a proposed and approved mixed-use skyscraper by the City of Miami in 2006 with a Major Use Special Permit in the 2000s development boom and  construction was expected to begin in 2008. The building was essentially put on hold then cancelled due to financial reasons during the Great Recession.

The building was to be constructed spanning two lots that form a triangle lot at the fork where South Miami Avenue and Southeast 1st Avenue diverge in Miami's Brickell Financial District. It was to be built over Southeast 11th Street and the Metromover elevated track. As of June 2011, the site was still fenced off and vacant; in 2012 the small triangular parcel was temporarily converted into a park, much of which was replaced by construction of a sales center for the new building. The lots were then sold to the current developer, Ugo Colombo of CMC Group with Vladislav Doronin, who redesigned the tower to be located only on the larger lot. It would have also featured a mechanical parking garage.

In 2017, CMC took out $236 million in construction financing, including $138.3 million from Bank of the Ozarks (now called Bank OZK), for Brickell Flatiron. Brickell Flatiron topped-off construction at the end of 2018 and received TCO (temporary certificate of occupancy) in October 2019. Brickell Flatiron, which was designed by architect Luis Revuelta, is among the tallest towers in Miami at 736 feet. The condo tower features interiors by Massimo Iosa Ghini of Italy's Iosa Ghini Associati. The developer is Ugo Colombo's CMC Group Inc.

Gallery

See also
 List of tallest buildings in Miami

References

External links
 
 Brickell Flatiron at Emporis
 Miami's Future Skyscrapers Part II

Residential skyscrapers in Miami
Residential condominiums in Miami
Residential buildings completed in 2019
2019 establishments in Florida